Russell Mountain is a summit in Iron County in the U.S. state of Missouri. The mountain lies just east of Taum Sauk Mountain and Missouri Route CC provides access to the two peaks from combined Missouri routes 21 and 72 to the east. The town of Ironton is about six miles to the northeast. The Tom Sauk Trail traverses the Russell Mountain ridge.

Russell Mountain most likely has the name of Giles Russell, a businessperson in the local mining industry.

References

Mountains of Iron County, Missouri
Mountains of Missouri